The Malitubog River is one of the major tributaries of the Maradugao River in Mindanao, Philippines. The Malitubog–Maridagao River Irrigation System supports about 5,500 hectares of rice fields within the Autonomous Region in Muslim Mindanao. The Municipality of Alamada's easternmost boundary is ends in the left bank of the river.

References

Rivers of the Philippines